The tunica vasculosa lentis is an extensive capillary network, spreading over the posterior and lateral surfaces of the lens of the eye. It disappears shortly after birth.

See also
 Persistent tunica vasculosa lentis

References

Human eye anatomy